Momauk() is a town in the Kachin State in the northernmost part of Myanmar.

External links
Satellite map at Maplandia.com

Township capitals of Myanmar
Populated places in Kachin State